Asteroma inconspicuum is a plant pathogen that causes anthracnose on elm.

References

External links 
 Index Fungorum
 USDA ARS Fungal Database

Fungal tree pathogens and diseases
Diaporthales